Behjat Sadr (29 May 1924 – 10 August 2009), also known as Behjat Sadr Mahallāti, was an Iranian modern art painter whose works have been exhibited in New York, Paris, and Rome. In her paintings, Sadr is known for using a palette knife on canvases or metallic surfaces to create  visual rhythm, movement and geometric shapes.

Biography 
Behjat Sadr Mahallāti was born to Mohammad Sadr Mahallāti and Qamar Amini Sadr in Arak, Iran on 29 May 1924. After her studies at the Faculty of Fine Arts at the University of Tehran, she obtained a scholarship to Italy, where she attended the Accademia di Belle Arti in Rome and the Accademia di Belle Arti di Napoli in Naples.

Soon after arriving in Rome, she abandoned academic painting for an abstract approach. Sadr's first major exhibition was at the Gallery La Bussola in Roma in 1958. She had participated a year before at the twenty-eighth Venice Biennial in 1956 and won the second prize of San Vito Romano. During her years in Rome, her friendship deepened during with the Persian poet Forough Farrokhzad, who had been her student in Tehran. In Rome, she also met her second husband, the Persian composer, Morteza Hannaneh, whom she married in 1975 and with whom she had her only child, Kakuti (Mitra) Hannaneh.

In 1957, Sadr decided to return to the University of Tehran as a professor, despite opportunities to continue her painting in Rome and Paris. She continued teaching in Tehran for almost 20 years. 

Awarded the Royal Grand Prize at  theTehran Biennial 1962, she participated in international art fairs like the Venice Biennial and Sao Paulo Biennial and in many personal and group exhibitions. She spent two years in Paris on sabbatical in 1968 and 1975.

In 1980, one year after the Islamic Revolution in Iran,  Sadr and her daughter moved to Paris.

Death and legacy 
Sadr was diagnosed with breast cancer in the 1980s but continued to paint. She died of a heart attack on 10 August 2009 at the age of 85, while swimming in Corsica. Several times in her writings, she spoke of her wish to die in the sea.
Sadr was the first female contemporary painter to be considered on the same level as her male colleagues in Iran.

In 2006, Sadr was the subject of a documentary film called Behjat Sadr: Time Suspended, directed by Mitra Farahani. This film includes footage of the artist at work, as well as extensive interviews.

Group exhibitions 
 1956: Venice Biennial, Venice, Italy
 1957: Venice Biennial, Venice, Italy
 1957: Galleria Il Pincio, Rome, Italy
 1962: Venice Biennial, Venice, Italy
 1962: The 3rd Tehran Painting Biennial, Tehran, Iran
 1962: São Paulo Biennial, São Paulo, Brazil
 1987: Iranian Contemporary Art: Four Women, Foxley Leach Gallery, Washington DC

See also 
 List of Iranian women artists

References

External links
 Official Movie Trailer for Behjat Sadr: Time Suspended (2006)
 "Playing with reality: The art of Behjat Sadr" interview from The Iranian (2002)

1924 births
2009 deaths
20th-century Iranian women artists
21st-century Iranian women artists
Iranian women painters
Contemporary painters
People from Arak, Iran
Iranian emigrants to France